Silk Torpedo is the seventh album by the English rock band Pretty Things. This is their second album without Wally Waller, the group's rhythm guitarist/bassist since 1967. The album has more of a glam rock feel, a contrast from their early R&B years and their psychedelic years.

The album was the first to be released in the UK on the Swan Song Records label.

Track listing

Personnel
The Pretty Things
Phil May – lead vocals, percussion
Pete Tolson – lead and acoustic guitars, bass
Jon Povey – keyboards, backing vocals, harmonica, percussion
Gordon John Edwards – bass, backing vocals, keyboards, guitar
Skip Alan – drums, backing vocals, percussion
with:
Jack Green – backing vocals
Silver Band - brass on "Is It Only Love"
Technical
Norman Smith – production
Keith Harwood – engineer
Hipgnosis – cover art

References

1974 albums
Pretty Things albums
Swan Song Records albums
Albums with cover art by Hipgnosis
Albums produced by Norman Smith (record producer)
Albums recorded at Olympic Sound Studios